Soltera is a 1999 Filipino film produced by Star Cinema, starring Claudine Barretto, Diether Ocampo and Ms. Maricel Soriano. The film was directed by Jerry Lopez Sineneng. Barretto and Ocampo reunited since Mula sa Puso (both two-year run drama series and movie version released in February).

Plot

Sandra (Maricel Soriano) is a wedding planner whose sisters Lorraine (Rita Avila), Bessie (Maila Gumila) are now married. On the wedding day of her sister Cathy (Julia Clarete), she met a young real estate agent Eric Robles (Diether Ocampo). With the help of her gay friend Jojo (Raymond Bagatsing), the two started a budding relationship despite their age gap and live-in. However, Sandra's family are not-so agree with Eric because he is too young for Sandra. Eric then became close to Sandra's employee Lisa (Claudine Barretto). When Sandra decided to go to the United States, Eric confessed that he loves Lisa, but Lisa rejects Eric's love because it's not right. When Sandra came back, she loved Eric more, but she would find out about Eric and Lisa's relationship. This cause Lisa to resign from her job and Eric to be kicked-out. Sandra then confessed to Jojo that she is pregnant, but became depressed because she was left by Eric. Eric returned and asked forgiveness to Sandra, which she accepted. Sandra also told Eric that he will not deprive her child to him and she said that she can be happy alone.

Cast
Maricel Soriano as Sandra Valdez
Diether Ocampo as Enrico "Eric" Robles
Claudine Barretto as Liza
Raymond Bagatsing as Jojo Morales
Nida Blanca† as Sandra's mother
Rita Avila as Lorraine
Maila Gumila as Bessie
Julia Clarete as Cathy
Ino Sevilla as Cathy's husband
Alicia Alonzo as Liza's mother
Miguel dela Rosa as Edwin
Don Laurel as Abdon
Donnie Fernandez as Ruel
Mel Kimura as Mel
Edu Manzano as Arthur
Cedric Nicomedes as Mark
Albert Zialcita as Ninong Louie

Soundtracks
 Hindi Ko Kaya
 Composed and written by Jake Nicdao
 Performed by Geneva Cruz
 Courtersy of Universal Records
 I Think I'm in Love
 Composed by Cecille Azarcon
 Performer by Kuh Ledesma

Awards and recognition
The movie was nominated for Best picture while Soriano was nominated for Best Actress at the [8th FAP Awards.

References

External links
 

1999 films
Star Cinema films
1990s Tagalog-language films
LGBT-related drama films
Philippine LGBT-related films
1999 LGBT-related films
Films directed by Jerry Lopez Sineneng